Peridroma is a genus of moths of the family Noctuidae.

Selected Species
 Peridroma albiorbis (Warren, 1912)
 Peridroma ambrosioides (Walker, 1857)
 Peridroma chersotoides (Butler, 1881)
 Peridroma chilenaria Angulo & Jana-Sáenz, 1984
 Peridroma cinctipennis (Butler, 1881)
 Peridroma clerica (Butler, 1882)
 Peridroma coniotis (Hampson, 1903)
 Peridroma differens (Walker, [1857])
 Peridroma neurogramma (Meyrick, 1899)
 Peridroma saucia (Hübner, [1808])
 Peridroma selenias (Meyrick, 1899)
 Peridroma semidolens (Walker, 1857)

References
Natural History Museum Lepidoptera genus database
Peridroma at funet

Noctuinae
Moth genera